The Tamarind Seed is a 1974 romantic thriller drama film written and directed by Blake Edwards and starring Julie Andrews and Omar Sharif. Based on the 1971 novel of the same name by Evelyn Anthony, the film is about a British Home Office functionary and a Soviet era attaché who are lovers involved in Cold War intrigue. The Tamarind Seed was the first film produced by Lorimar Productions. The film score was composed by John Barry.

Plot
After the death of her husband in a fiery car crash, and a failed love affair with married man Group Captain Richard Paterson, Judith Farrow, an attractive British Home Office assistant, meets handsome Soviet attaché Colonel Sverdlov while on vacation in Barbados, but their budding personal relationship does not go unnoticed by British intelligence. Judith is enchanted by a story that the seeds of a tamarind tree on a certain plantation take the form of the head of a slave hanged from a tamarind, a tale mocked by Sverdlov. Returning to London, Judith finds a surprise gift from Sverdlov: an envelope containing a tamarind seed.

Convinced Sverdlov is recruiting Judith to be a spy, British intelligence officer Jack Loder has his hands full with a clandestine Russian spy, code-named "Blue", when he learns his assistant, George MacLeod, is having an affair with the wife of a British diplomat, Fergus Stephenson, who is a conduit of state secrets. Loder cautions Judith, who is to contact him if she hears from Sverdlov.

Meanwhile Sverdlov, assigned to the Soviet Embassy in Paris, suspects his boss, General Golitysn, distrusts him, and insists Judith can be recruited as a spy, a story he shares with Judith when he visits her in London. Amidst drumbeat of suspicions on the cusp of betrayal and blackmail, a gaggle of real and possible double-agents abound in a tangled web amidst a budding Sverdlov-Judith love story that could also be a ruse.

Sverdlov pleads with Golitsyn for more time to recruit demure Judith, a ploy that’s wearing thin with the suspicious General. Sverdlov steals the "Blue" file, his bargaining chip with London to get asylum in Canada, and he finagles a romantic stop in Barbados where he’s to meet Judith. 

Sverdlov eludes an assassination attempt by Golitsyn’s agents at London Airport and meets Judith in Barbados where they are sequestered in a beachside bungalow, where they eventually consummate their relationship. But the General is hot on his tail and jets a group of Soviet agents disguised as wealthy businessmen on holiday to attack the bungalow with napalm, an explosive bullet-riddled event that kills most of the agents, reportedly kills Sverdlov, destroys the "Blue" file, and traumatizes Judith, who narrowly escapes with her life.

Loder now knows "Blue" is Fergus Stephenson, a double agent he can now manipulate with low-grade information for Moscow, until the Soviets eventually believe Stephenson is a double agent against themselves and kill him, Loder postulates. Loder meets convalescing shell-shocked Judith in Barbados where he divulges that newspaper accounts of Sverdlov’s death were a false cover; seconds before the explosion Sverdlov was whisked away to Canada by MacLeod. Her doubts dissolve when Loder gives her an envelope that contains a tamarind seed. 

Later on, in a bucolic Canadian mountain valley, Judith and Sverdlov share a lovers' embrace.

Cast

Production
The Tamarind Seed was partly financed by Sir Lew Grade as part of a two-movie deal to get Andrews to commit to a TV show; the other film was Trilby.

It was Andrews' first film in four years since Darling Lili. During that time, she had married Blake Edwards and concentrated on raising their children.

"This is a nice film," said Andrews, "It's just right for my comeback."

Filming locations
The Tamarind Seed was filmed on location in Barbados, Belgravia (including Eaton Square) in London, and Paris.

Reception
The film received a Royal Command Performance.

Box office
Lew Grade said the film "did fairly well" at the box office but claims that he struggled to make much money from it because Edwards and Andrews took such a large percentage of the profits (Andrews 10% of the gross, Edwards 5%). This was common practice for a top-billed star and writer/director.

Critical response
In a 1974 review in Movietone News, Kathleen Murphy wrote that the film was a good example of the concept of "the community of two" against the backdrop of complex international forces waging a cold war. Murphy writes: 

Murphy concluded that The Tamarind Seed turns this genre of "the community of two" into the genuine article that "shifts and reshapes our thinking and feeling and seeing." In its place, a "new perception of reality" transcends the confines of the movie theater and makes its way into the "larger, less defined, and thus less understandable, territory of our lives."

Cultural references
The film was spoofed in Mad magazine in 1975 as The Tommy-Red Seed.

References

Bibliography

External links
 
 
 
 

1974 films
1974 romantic drama films
1970s American films
1970s British films
1970s English-language films
1970s romantic thriller films
1970s spy drama films
1970s spy thriller films
1970s thriller drama films
American spy drama films
American spy thriller films
American romantic drama films
American romantic thriller films
American thriller drama films
British spy drama films
British spy thriller films
British romantic drama films
British romantic thriller films
British thriller drama films
Cold War spy films
Embassy Pictures films
Films based on British novels
Films based on thriller novels
Films directed by Blake Edwards
Films scored by John Barry (composer)
Films set in Barbados
Films shot in Barbados
Films with screenplays by Blake Edwards
ITC Entertainment films